is a Japanese automotive aftermarket company specialising in performance tuning parts for cars. The company is widely known for its sub-brand of tuning parts GReddy and the turbochargers under this brand.

GReddy/The Trust Company LTD

The Trust Company
Founded in Japan in 1977, The Trust Company LTD has become a major player in automotive performance products. With popular brand names like GReddy, GREX, and GRacer, the Trust Company offers one of the widest varieties of performance automotive components. They are most well known for their complete cat-back exhaust systems with unique straight-through muffler design and bolt-on turbocharger kits.

Since 1994, the development and distribution of Trust Company products in the United States has been accomplished by GReddy Performance Products, based in Irvine, California. Trust was unable to use its own name there as it was already copyrighted, therefore they became officially known as GReddy.

In August 2008 the TRUST Company in Japan consolidated their supply of GReddy products throughout Australia and New Zealand which has culminated in the establishment of GReddy Oceania based in Sydney Australia.

GReddy
The division that makes exhaust systems, turbo kits, cooling systems, electronics and accessory lines for Japanese and American cars is named GReddy.

GReddy is pronounced GRED-dy, from the words "GREAT" and "Eddy", as in a strong swirling wind current, referring to the strong swirling intake air of a turbocharger.

The GR in uppercase and the eddy in lowercase to show where the two words were combined. It also works well for the GReddy trademarked logo.

See also
Car tuning
Sport compact
SEMA
Tokyo Auto Salon

References

External links
GReddy Web Page
The Trust Company Web Page
GReddy Oceania Web Page

Automotive companies of Japan
Automotive companies established in 1977
Automotive motorsports and performance companies
Companies based in Chiba Prefecture
Japanese brands
Turbocharger manufacturers